Virginia's 4th Senate district is one of 40 districts in the Senate of Virginia. It has been represented by Republican Ryan McDougle since his victory in a 2006 special election.

Geography
District 4 stretches from just outside Fredericksburg to the Chesapeake Bay, including all of the Northern Neck and parts of the Middle Peninsula. It covers all of Caroline, Essex, Middlesex, Lancaster, Northumberland, and Richmond Counties, as well as parts of Hanover, King George, Spotsylvania, and Westmoreland Counties.

The district overlaps with Virginia's 1st and 7th congressional districts, and with the 54th, 55th, 97th, 98th, and 99th districts of the Virginia House of Delegates.

Recent election results

2019

2015

2011

Federal and statewide results in District 4

Historical results
All election results below took place prior to 2011 redistricting, and thus were under different district lines.

2007

2006 special

2003

1999

1995

District officeholders since 1940

References

Virginia Senate districts
Caroline County, Virginia
Essex County, Virginia
Hanover County, Virginia
Middlesex County, Virginia
Lancaster County, Virginia
Richmond County, Virginia
Northumberland County, Virginia
King George County, Virginia
Spotsylvania County, Virginia
Westmoreland County, Virginia